The temple of Artemis Azzanathkona is located in Dura Europos in the east of present-day Syria, and was dedicated to a syncretic belief of Artemis and Azzanathkona. 

In Roman times the temple became a headquarters for the Cohors XX Palmyrenorum, a infantry and cavalry unit. A military archive of the Cohors was found in one of the temple rooms. The archive consists of numerous papyri and parchments; it is one the most important finds that shed light on the organization of Roman military units.

The temple complex was excavated in 1931–32. Smaller follow-up examinations took place between 2007 and 2010.

Description 
The temple was built against the north wall near the Temple of Bel. The earliest inscriptions is dated as 12/13 AD. The temple and the next building weren't in a good state when found, so its hard to know how they were related. The temple had an almost square precinct surrounded by rooms built at different periods; it had two sanctuary units, both dated approximately to the first century AD. The building was very close to the wall, Von Gerkan stated that because of that "the defensive function of the wall had at that time fallen into neglect". A wall tower was included into the temple's precinct; Clark Hopkins suggested that "the room in the tower was built relatively late (though apparently before the earthquake of A.D. 160/161), as it is bounded in part by a late portion of the city wall".

In Roman times, these rooms were included in the military camp set up in the north of Dura Europos. One of the rooms was with graffiti and drawings and it has been suggested that the room was used by military scribes. In Roman times, a second entrance was broken into the existing western wall of the complex and an extra anteroom was built for it.

Cult 
An inscription from 161 AD said that the temple was dedicated to Artemis Azzanathkona; her followers believed in a "syncretized combination" of a Greek goddess Artemis and local Syrian deity Azzanathkona (Atargatis).

Further reading 
 Simon James: The Roman Military Base at Dura-Europos, Syria, Oxford 2019. , p. 70–78
 Rostovtzeff M.I.: The Excavations at Dura-Europos / Preliminary report of 5 season of work, 1934, pp. 131-180,

References 

Archaeological discoveries in Syria
Dura-Europos
Temples in Syria